St. Matthew's Church is a church located in Nathia Gali, Khyber Pakhtunkhwa, Pakistan. The church is looked after by a Muslim family for three generations.

It has a purpose-built rectory, lodging units, staircase, and an old piano.

History
It was built entirely of cedar wood in 1914 and was designed by Colonel Hope Waddell Kelsall.

References

Churches in Pakistan
1914 establishments in British India
Churches completed in 1914